Horňany is a village and municipality in Trenčín District in the Trenčín Region of north-western Slovakia.

History
In historical records the village was first mentioned in 1352.

Geography
The municipality lies at an altitude of 222 metres, spanning an area of 6.707 km². Its population is approximately 400 people.

Genealogical resources
The records for genealogical research are available at the state archive "Statny Archiv in Bratislava, Nitra, Slovakia"

 Roman Catholic church records (births/marriages/deaths): 1725-1898 (parish B)

See also
 List of municipalities and towns in Slovakia

External links
https://web.archive.org/web/20080111223415/http://www.statistics.sk/mosmis/eng/run.html
Surnames of living people in Hornany

Villages and municipalities in Trenčín District